John Douglas (1830–1911) was an English architect based in Chester, Cheshire. His output included new churches, alterations to and restoration of existing churches, church furnishings, new houses and alterations to existing houses, and a variety of other buildings, including shops, banks, offices, schools, memorials and public buildings.  Perhaps his best-known design is that for the Eastgate Clock in Chester.  His architectural styles were eclectic, but as he worked during the period of the Gothic Revival much of his output incorporates elements of the English Gothic style.  He was also influenced by architectural styles from the mainland of Europe, and frequently included elements of French, German, and Netherlandish architecture.  Douglas is probably best remembered for his incorporation of vernacular elements in his buildings, in particular half-timbering, in which he was influenced by the black-and-white revival in Chester.  Other vernacular elements he employed included tile-hanging, pargeting, and the use of decorative brick in diapering and the design of tall chimney stacks.  Of particular importance is Douglas' use of joinery and highly detailed wood carving.

John Douglas was born in the Cheshire village of Sandiway and was articled to the Lancaster architect E. G. Paley, later becoming his chief assistant.  He established an office in Chester in either 1855 or 1860, from where he practised throughout his career.  Initially he ran the office himself but in 1884 he appointed his assistant, Daniel Porter Fordham, as a partner.  When Fordham retired in 1897, he was succeeded by Charles Howard Minshull. In 1909 this partnership was dissolved and Douglas ran the office alone until his death in 1911.  As his office was in Chester, most of his works were in Cheshire and North Wales, although some were further afield, in Lancashire, Staffordshire, Warwickshire, and Scotland.

From an early stage in his career, Douglas attracted commissions from wealthy and powerful patrons, the first of which came from Hugh Cholmondeley, 2nd Baron Delamere. His most important patrons were the Grosvenor family of Eaton Hall, namely Richard Grosvenor, 2nd Marquess of Westminster, Hugh Grosvenor, 1st Duke of Westminster, and Hugh Grosvenor, 2nd Duke of Westminster. Douglas designed a large number and variety of buildings in the family's Eaton Hall estate and the surrounding villages.  Other important patrons were William Molyneux, 4th Earl of Sefton, Rowland Egerton-Warburton of Arley Hall, George Cholmondeley, 5th Marquess of Cholmondeley, and Francis Egerton, 3rd Earl of Ellesmere.  Later in his career Douglas carried out commissions for W. E. Gladstone and his family, and for W. H.Lever.

Most of Douglas' new churches have been recognised as listed buildings.  In England and Wales a Grade I listed building is one "of exceptional interest, sometimes considered to be internationally important", Grade II* consists of "particularly important buildings of more than special interest", and in Grade II are buildings which "are nationally important and of special interest". In Scotland, Category A contains "buildings of national or international importance, either architectural or historic, or fine little-altered examples of some particular period, style or building type", Category B consists of "buildings of regional or more than local importance, or major examples of some particular period, style or building type which may have been altered", and in Category C are "buildings of local importance, lesser examples of any period, style, or building type, as originally constructed or moderately altered; and simple traditional buildings which group well with others in categories A and B".

This list includes the 40 new churches designed by Douglas that were built.  The details are taken from the Catalogue of Works in the biography by Edward Hubbard.  Churches attributed to Douglas by Hubbard on stylistic grounds together with evidence of a local association are included, even though they are not confirmed by other reliable evidence.  Where this is the case, it is stated in the Notes column. Unexecuted schemes are not included.

Key

New churches

See also

List of church restorations, amendments and furniture by John Douglas
List of houses and associated buildings by John Douglas
List of non-ecclesiastical and non-residential works by John Douglas

References
Citations

Sources

 
 New Churches
Douglas, John
Douglas, John
Lists of buildings and structures in Cheshire